Derek Connolly (born c. 1976 in Miami, Florida) is an American screenwriter and film producer, mostly known for his collaborations with director Colin Trevorrow on the films Safety Not Guaranteed, Jurassic World, and Jurassic World: Fallen Kingdom.

Connolly attended Miami Palmetto Senior High School in Miami and New York University Tisch School of the Arts.

Career
Connolly was listed on Variety's Ten Screenwriters to Watch in 2012. Connolly rewrote Kong: Skull Island (2017), for Warner Bros. and Legendary Pictures. Connolly co-wrote early (and ultimately uncredited) drafts of Pacific Rim: Uprising with Guillermo del Toro, Jon Spaihts and Zak Penn; the final screenplay was by Steven S. DeKnight, Emily Carmichael, Kira Snyder and T.S. Nowlin; based on characters by Travis Beacham and del Toro Connolly and Trevorrow co-wrote the screenplay for the sequel Jurassic World: Fallen Kingdom (2018), and by February 2018, had written a story treatment for Jurassic World Dominion, set for release on June 10, 2022.

Connolly was reported to be working on a remake of the film Flight of the Navigator, as well as writing an upcoming Pixar film directed by Teddy Newton. Connolly has been tapped to pen the script for a Metal Gear film.

Filmography

Unproduced screenplay 

 Star Wars: Duel of the Fates (co-written with Colin Trevorrow)

References

External links

Living people
1976 births
American film producers
American male screenwriters
Tisch School of the Arts alumni
Writers from Miami
Miami Palmetto Senior High School alumni